A flaperon (a portmanteau of flap and aileron) on an aircraft's wing is a type of control surface that combines the functions of both flaps and ailerons.  Some smaller kitplanes have flaperons for reasons of simplicity of manufacture, while some large commercial aircraft such as the Boeing 747, 767, 777, and 787 may have a flaperon between the flaps and aileron. The 787 has a configuration known as a SpoileFlaperon that combines the action of spoilers, flaps and ailerons into one control surface.

Operation
In addition to controlling the roll or bank of an aircraft, as do conventional ailerons, both flaperons can be lowered together to reduce stall speed, similarly to a set of flaps.

On a plane with flaperons, the pilot still has the standard separate controls for ailerons and flaps, but the flap control also varies the flaperon's range of movement. A mechanical device called a "mixer" is used to combine the pilot's input into the flaperons. While the use of flaperons rather than ailerons and flaps might seem to be a simplification, some complexity remains through the intricacies of the mixer.

Some aircraft, such as the Denney Kitfox, suspend the flaperons below the wing (rather in the manner of slotted flaps) to provide undisturbed airflow at high angles of attack or low airspeeds.  When the flaperon surface is hinged below the trailing edge of a wing, they are sometimes named "Junker Flaperons", from the doppelflügel (lit., "double wing") type of trailing edge surfaces used on a number of Junkers aircraft of the 1930s, such as the Junkers Ju 52 airliner, and the iconic Junkers Ju 87 Stuka  World War II dive bomber.

Research 
Current research seeks to coordinate the functions of aircraft flight control surfaces (ailerons, elevators, elevons, flaps, and flaperons) so as to reduce weight, cost, drag, inertia, and thereby achieve improved control response, reduced complexity, and reduced radar visibility for stealth purposes. Beneficiaries of such research might include drones (UAVs) and the latest fighter aircraft. 

These research approaches include flexible wings and fluidics:

Flexible wings
In flexible wings, much or all of a wing surface can change shape in flight to deflect air flow. The X-53 Active Aeroelastic Wing is a NASA effort. The Adaptive Compliant Wing is a military and commercial effort.  This may be seen as a return to the wing warping used and patented by the Wright brothers.

Fluidics
In fluidics, forces in vehicles occur via circulation control, in which larger, more complex mechanical parts are replaced by smaller simpler fluidic systems (slots which emit air flows), where larger forces in fluids are diverted by smaller jets or flows of fluid intermittently, to change the direction of vehicles. In this use, fluidics promises lower mass, costs (up to 50% less), and very low inertia and response times, as well as simplicity.

See also 

 Aileron
 Spoileron

References 

Aircraft controls
Aircraft wing design